is a Japanese footballer currently playing as a goalkeeper for Vanraure Hachinohe.

Career statistics

Club
.

Notes

References

External links

1995 births
Living people
Association football people from Kanagawa Prefecture
Senshu University alumni
Japanese footballers
Association football goalkeepers
Artista Asama players
Thespakusatsu Gunma players
Vanraure Hachinohe players